Episannina lodimana is a moth of the family Sesiidae. It is known from the Democratic Republic of the Congo.

References

Sesiidae
Insects of the Democratic Republic of the Congo
Moths of Africa
Endemic fauna of the Democratic Republic of the Congo